Yen Press, LLC is an American manga and graphic novel publisher co-owned by Kadokawa Corporation and Hachette Book Group. It published Yen Plus, a monthly comic anthology, between 2008 and 2013. In addition to translated material, Yen Press has published original series, most notably a manga adaptation of James Patterson's Maximum Ride and Svetlana Chmakova's Nightschool.

History
Yen Press was founded in 2006 by former Borders Group buyer Kurt Hassler and DC Comics VP Rich Johnson. In July 2007, it was announced that Yen Press was to absorb ICEkunion, a Korean publisher that had been publishing manhwa in the United States. While the manga titles bearing ICEkunion's label would be continued to be sold in stores, subsequent printings would bear the Yen Press logo. Hassler assured fans, "We plan to pick up all the existing [ICEkunion] titles...We're going to continue everything, so fans shouldn't worry. None of these series are going to fall into a void."

The first issue of Yen Press's comic magazine Yen Plus was published on July 29, 2008. The magazine became online-only in 2010 and was discontinued altogether in 2013.

In 2009, Yen Press announced that it had acquired the rights to Kiyohiko Azuma's manga Yotsuba&! and Azumanga Daioh from their former licensee, A.D. Vision. In September 2009, Yen Press reissued the first five volumes of Yotsuba&!, in addition to publishing the sixth volume; Azumanga Daioh was reissued with a new translation in December 2009.

On April 11, 2016, it was announced that Yen Press would function as a joint venture between Hachette Book Group and major Japanese publisher Kadokawa Dwango, with Kadokawa owning 51% of the company.

In 2017, Yen Press launched JY, an imprint for publishing graphic novels aimed towards middle grade readers.

On April 15, 2022, Yen Press, in collaboration with REDICE Studio and RIVERSE, launched Ize Press, an imprint for publishing Korean webtoons and novels, with their first titles being, 7Fates: Chakho, Dark Moon, and The Star Seekers all written and illustrated by HYBE in collaboration with BTS, Enhypen, and Tomorrow X Together respectively. Other titles included were Tomb Raider King, The World After the Fall, The Boxer, My Gently Raised Beasts, The Remarried Empress, and Villains Are Destined to Die.

At Anime NYC 2022, J-Novel Club announced its partnership with Yen Press in order to print their titles.

Titles

Original series

 Beautiful Creatures
 Berrybrook Middle School series*
 The Clique
 Cuckoos Three
 Daniel X+
 The Dark-Hunters: Infinity
 Gabby & Gator
 Gossip Girl+
 Hollow City
 The Infernal Devices
 Interview with the Vampire: Claudia's Story
 Kitty & Dino
 Maximum Ride+
 Milkyway Hitchhiking
 Miss Peregrine's Home for Peculiar Children
 The Mortal Instruments
 The Night Angel Trilogy
 Nightschool+
 New Moon: The Graphic Novel
 Reindeer Boy
 Soulless
 Twilight: The Graphic Novel
 Witch & Wizard
 The Wolf Gift
 The World of Quest
 Zoo

Manga

 86
 A Bride's Story
 ACCA: 13-Territory Inspection Dept.
 ACCA 13-Territory Inspection Dept. P.S.
 Accel World
 Adachi and Shimamura
 After We Gazed at the Starry Sky
 After-School Bitchcraft
 After-school Hanako-kun
 Akame ga Kill!
 Akame ga Kill! Zero
 Aldnoah.Zero Season One
 Alice in Murderland
 Alice in the Country of Hearts
 Alice in the Country of Hearts: My Fanatic Rabbit
 Alice on Deadlines
 The Angel of Elhamburg
 Angels of Death
 Angels of Death Episode.0
 Ani - Imo
 Anne Happy
 Another
 Aoharu × Machinegun
 Aphorism
 Appare-Ranman!
 Apparently, Disillusioned Adventurers Will Save the World
 Are You Alice?
 As Miss Beelzebub Likes
 Associate Professor Akira Takatsuki's Conjecture
 Assorted Entanglements
 The Asterisk War
 Azumanga Daioh
 B. Ichi
 Baccano!
 Baka and Test
 Bamboo Blade+
 Banished from the Hero's Party
 Barakamon
 Bestia
 The Betrayal Knows My Name
 Big Hero 6
 Big Order
 Black Bullet
 Black Butler+
 Black Detective
 Black God
 Blood Lad
 Bloody Brat
 Bloody Cross
 Bofuri: I Don't Want to Get Hurt, so I'll Max Out My Defense.
 The Boy and the Beast
 Breasts Are My Favorite Things in the World!
 A Bride's Story
 Btooom!
 Bunny Drop
 Bungo Stray Dogs
 Bungo Stray Dogs: Another Story, Vol. 1: Yukito Ayatsuji vs. Natsuhiko Kyogoku
 Bungo Stray Dogs: BEAST
 Bungo Stray Dogs: Dead Apple
 Bungo Stray Dogs: Woof!
 Call the Name of the Night
 Can't Stop Cursing You
 Captivated, by You
 Carole & Tuesday
 The Case Study of Vanitas
 Cat Paradise
 Catch These Hands!
 Caterpillar Girl and Bad Texter Boy
 A Certain Magical Index
 Chaika - The Coffin Princess
 Chained Soldier
 Chio's School Road
 Chitose Is in the Ramune Bottle
 Cirque du Freak
 Cocoon Entwined
 Coffee Moon
 Combatants will be Dispatched!
 Corpse Party: Blood Covered
 Corpse Party: Book of Shadows
 Corpse Princess
 Count Fujiwara's Suffering
 Crimson Prince
 Crimson-Shell
 Cross-Dressing Villainess Cecilia Sylvie
 The Dark History of the Reincarnated Villainess
 Darker than Black
 Days on Fes
 Dead Mount Death Play
 Dear NOMAN
 Death March to the Parallel World Rhapsody
 Delicious in Dungeon
 Demon From Afar
 Demon King Ena-sama Goes to a Manga School
 The Demon Sword Master of Excalibur Academy
 Demonizer Zilch
 The Detective Is Already Dead
 The Devil Is a Part-Timer!
 The Devil Is a Part-Timer! High School!
 The Devil Is a Part-Timer! Official Anthology Comic
 Dimension W
 The Disappearance of Nagato Yuki-chan
 Dive!!
 Do You Like the Nerdy Nurse?
 Do You Love Your Mom and Her Two-Hit Multi-Target Attacks?'
 Doomsday With My Dog Doubt Dragon Girl Dragons Rioting Durarara!! Durarara!! Re;Dollars Arc Éclair: A Girls' Love Anthology That Resonates in Your Heart Elden Ring: The Road to the Erdtree The Elder Sister-like One Embrace Your Size The Eminence in Shadow Emma Eniale & Dewiela Erased The Essence of Being a Muse The Executioner and Her Way of Life Farewell to My Alter The Fiancée Chosen by the Ring Fiancée of the Wizard Final Fantasy Lost Stranger Final Fantasy Type-0 Final Fantasy Type-0 Side Story First Love Monster For the Kid I Saw in My Dreams Forbidden Scrollery From the Red Fog Fruits Basket Fruits Basket Another Fruits Basket: The Three Musketeers Arc Fullmetal Alchemist †
 GA Geijutsuka Art Design Class Gabriel DropOut Gahi-chan! Game of Familia -Family Senki- The Gay Who Turned Kaiju The Geek Ex-Hitman The Girl I Saved on the Train Turned Out to Be My Childhood Friend The Girl Without a Face Girls' Last Tour Goblin Slayer Goblin Slayer: Brand New Day Goblin Slayer Side Story: Year One Goblin Slayer Side Story II: Dai Katana God Bless the Mistaken God Shining Moonlight Howling Moon Golden Japanesque: A Splendid Yokohama Romance Gou-dere Sora Nagihara Graineliers Grim Reaper and 4 Girlfriends Grimgar of Fantasy and Ash Hakumei and Mikochi Hana-chan and the Shape of the World Handa-kun Handyman Saitō in Another World Happy Sugar Life Hard-boiled Stories from the Cat Bar Hatsu*Haru He's My Only Vampire The Hero is Overpowered but Overly Cautious The Hero Laughs While Walking the Path of Vengeance a Second Time Hero Tales+
 Heroine No More Heterogenia Linguistico Hi, I'm a Witch, and My Crush Wants Me to Make a Love Potion High School DxD High School DxD: Asia and Koneko's Secret Contracts!? High School Prodigies Have It Easy Even in Another World Highschool of the Dead Higurashi When They Cry+
 Himeyuka and Rozione's Story Hinowa ga Crush! Hirano and Kagiura The Honor Student at Magic High School Honey Lemon Soda Horimiya Hybrid × Heart Magias Academy Ataraxia I Can't Reach You I Don't Know How to Give Birth! I Don't Know Which Is Love I Don't Need a Happy Ending I Got a Cheat Skill in Another World and Became Unrivaled in the Real World, Too I Kept Pressing the 100-Million Button and Came Out on Top I Love You So Much, I Hate You I Want to be a Receptionist in This Magical World I Want to Be a Wall I Was a Bottom-Tier Bureaucrat for 1,500 Years, and the Demon King Made Me a Minister I'm a "Behemoth", an S-Ranked Monster, but Mistaken for a Cat, I Live as an Elf Girl's Pet I'm Quitting Heroing I'm the Catlords' Manservant I'm the Hero, but the Demon Lord's Also Me I'm the Villainess, So I'm Taming the Final Boss I've Been an Omega Since Today I've Been Killing Slimes for 300 Years and Maxed Out My Level I've Been Killing Slimes for 300 Years and Maxed Out My Level Spin-off: The Red Dragon Academy for Girls Ibitsu Ichiroh! Id:Invaded #Brake Broken If the RPG World Had Social Media If Witch, Then Which? If You Could See Love The Illustrated Guide to Monster Girls Im: Great Priest Imhotep In Another World With My Smartphone In the Land of Leadale The Innocent Inu x Boku SS Interspecies Reviewers Interspecies Reviewers Comic Anthology: Darkness Is It Wrong to Try to Pick Up Girls in a Dungeon? Is It Wrong to Try to Pick Up Girls in a Dungeon? II Is It Wrong to Try to Pick Up Girls in a Dungeon? Familia Chronicle Is It Wrong to Try to Pick Up Girls in a Dungeon? Familia Chronicle Episode Freya Is It Wrong to Try to Pick Up Girls in a Dungeon? Memoria Freese Is It Wrong to Try to Pick Up Girls in a Dungeon?: Days of Goddess Is It Wrong to Try to Pick Up Girls in a Dungeon?: Sword Oratoria Is This a Zombie? The Isolator Judge Josee, the Tiger and the Fish Kagerou Daze Kaiju Girl Caramelise Kakegurui – Compulsive Gambler Kakegurui Twin Kaoru Mori: Anything and Something K-On!+
 K-On! College K-On! High School K-On! Shuffle Karneval Kaze no Hana Kemono Friends a la Carte Kemono Friends: Welcome to Japari Park! Kieli Killing Me! Kingdom Hearts II Kingdom Hearts III Kingdom Hearts 358/2 Days Kingdom Hearts Final Mix Kingdom Hearts: Chain of Memories Kin-iro Mosaic Kin-iro Mosaic, Best Wishes Kiss and White Lily for My Dearest Girl Kobato KonoSuba: An Explosion on this Wonderful World! KonoSuba: God's Blessing on this Wonderful World! Kowloon Generic Romance Kuzumi-kun, Can't You Read the Room? Laid-Back Camp Last Round Arthurs Let This Grieving Soul Retire Let's Go Karaoke! Liselotte & Witch's Forest Little Miss P Little Witch Academia*
 Log Horizon Log Horizon: The West Wind Brigade Lost Lad London Love and Heart Love at Fourteen Love of Kill Love Quest Lust Geass Magia Record: Puella Magi Madoka Side Story Magia Record: Puella Magi Madoka Side Story Another Story Magical Explorer Magical Girl Incident Magical Girl Raising Project The Magical Revolution of the Reincarnated Princess and the Genius Young Lady The Maid I Hired Recently Is Mysterious Mama Akuma Manner of Death Maoyu Me and My Beast Boss The Melancholy of Haruhi Suzumiya The Melancholy of Suzumiya Haruhi-chan Mermaid Boys Mieruko-chan Minami Nanami Wants to Shine Mint Chocolate The Misfortune of Kyon and Koizumi Mizuno & Chayama Monstaboo Monster and the Beast Monster Tamer Girls Monster Wrestling Monthly Girls' Nozaki-kun Mr. Flower Bride Mr. Flower Groom Murciélago My Broken Mariko My Dear Curse-Casting Vampiress My Girlfriend's a Geek My Instant Death Ability Is So Overpowered, No One in This Other World Stands a Chance Against Me! —AΩ— My Mate Is a Feline Gentleman My Monster Girl's Too Cool for You My Youth Romantic Comedy Is Wrong, As I Expected @comic Nabari no Ou+
 Namaiki Zakari Napping Princess: The Story of the Unknown Me NeNeNe New Japan Academy New York New York Nightmare Inspector: Yumekui Kenbun †
 Nights with a Cat Ninja Soccer No Game No Life, Please! No Matter How I Look at It, It's You Guys' Fault I'm Not Popular! Not Love But Delicious Foods Now Playing Nyankees O-Parts Hunter †
 Of the Red, the Light, and the Ayakashi Oh, My Sweet Alien! Olympos Omamori Himari One Week Friends Oninagi Oshi no Ko The Other World's Books Depend on the Bean Counter The Otherworlder, Exploring the Dungeon Our Last Crusade or the Rise of a New World Overlord Overlord a la Carte Overlord: The Undead King Oh! Pandora Hearts+
 Pandora Seven Penguin Gentlemen Phantom Tales of the Night Play It Cool, Guys Please Put Them On, Takamine-san Plunderer A Polar Bear in Love Prison School Puella Magi Homura Tamura Puella Magi Kazumi Magica: The Innocent Malice Puella Magi Madoka Magica Puella Magi Madoka Magica: The Different Story Puella Magi Madoka Magica: Homura's Revenge Puella Magi Madoka Magica: The Movie -Rebellion- Puella Magi Madoka Magica: Wraith Arc Puella Magi Oriko Magica Puella Magi Oriko Magica Sadness Prayer Puella Magi Suzune Magica Puella Magi Tart Magica: The Legend of Jeanne d'Arc Rascal Does Not Dream of Bunny Girl Senpai Raw Hero Re:Zero − Starting Life in Another World Re:Zero – The Frozen Bond Reborn as a Polar Bear: The Legend of How I Became a Forest Guardian Reborn as a Vending Machine, I Now Wander the Dungeon The Record of a Fallen Vampire †
 The Reformation of the World as Overseen by a Realist Demon King Reign of the Seven Spellblades A Reincarnated Witch Spells Doom Renaissance Eve Restaurant to Another World Rokka -Braves of the Six Flowers- Romeo × Juliet Rose Guns Days Rose Guns Days Sorrowful Cross Knife The Royal Tutor Run on Your New Legs Rust Blaster Sacrificial Princess and the King of Beasts Sadako at the End of the World Saekano: How to Raise a Boring Girlfriend The Saga of Tanya the Evil Saint? Nope, Just a Monster Tamer Passing Through Saki Sakura no Himegoto Sasaki and Miyano Sasaki and Peeps Sasameke School-Live! School-Live! Letters School of Horns Scum's Wish Scumbag Loser The Second-Chance Noble Daughter Sets Out to Conquer the Dragon Emperor Secret The Secret Sakura Shares Secretly, I've been Suffering about being Sexless Secrets of the Silent Witch See You Tomorrow at the Food Court Sekirei Sekiro Side Story: Hanbei the Undying Servant × Service Seven Little Sons of the Dragon: A Collection of Seven Stories Sex Ed 120% Shadow Student Council Vice President Gives Her All Shadows House She Loves to Cook, and She Loves to Eat Shibuya Goldfish Shoulder-a-Coffin Kuro Shut-In Shoutarou Kominami Takes on the World Shy Silver Spoon Skull-face Bookseller Honda-san Slasher Maidens Smokin' Parade So, I Can't Play H! So I'm a Spider, So What? So I'm a Spider, So What? The Daily Lives of the Kumoko Sisters So What's Wrong with Getting Reborn as a Goblin? SOTUS Soul Eater+
 Soul Eater Not! Space Dandy Spice and Wolf Spiral: The Bonds of Reasoning Spirits & Cat Ears The Splendid Work of a Monster Maid Spy Classroom S.S. Astro Star Wars Leia, Princess of Alderaan Star Wars Rebels Star Wars: Lost Stars The Strange Creature at Kuroyuri Apartments Strawberry Fields Once Again Strike the Blood Studio Apartment, Good Lighting, Angel Included Stupid Love Comedy Sugar Apple Fairy Tale The Summer Hikaru Died Sumomomo Momomo+
 Sunbeams in the Sky Sundome Sunshine Sketch The Survived Alchemist with a Dream of Quiet Town Life! Suzunari! Sword Art Online Alternative Gun Gale Online Sword Art Online: Aincrad Sword Art Online: Calibur Sword Art Online: Fairy Dance Sword Art Online: Girls Ops Sword Art Online: Hollow Realization Sword Art Online: Mother's Rosario Sword Art Online: Phantom Bullet Sword Art Online: Progressive Sword Art Online: Progressive - Barcarolle of Froth Sword Art Online: Progressive - Scherzo of Deep Night Sword Art Online: Project Alicization Taboo Tattoo Tale of the Waning Moon Tales of the Kingdom Tales of Wedding Rings Teasing Master Takagi-san Tena on S-String A Terrified Teacher at Ghoul School That Time I Got Reincarnated as a Slime: The Ways of the Monster Nation Thermae Romae Thou Shalt Not Die Though You May Burn to Ash To Save the World, Can You Wake Up the Morning After with a Demi-Human? Today's Cerberus Tohyo Game: One Black Ballot to You Toilet-Bound Hanako-kun Tokyo Ravens Torture Princess: Fremd Torturchen Touge Oni: Primal God’s in Ancient Times Touring After the Apocalypse Triage X Trinity Seven Tsubaki-chou Lonely Planet Twinkle Stars Übel Blatt Ugly Duckling's Love Revolution Umineko When They Cry Uncle from Another World UNKNOWN Unnamed Memory Until Death Do Us Part Val × Love The Vampire & His Pleasant Companions The Villainess Stans the Heroes: Playing the Antagonist to Support Her Faves! The War Ends the World / Raises the World Welcome to the Erotic Bookstore Welcome to Wakaba-Soh What This World Is Made Of When a Magician's Pupil Smiles Whenever Our Eyes Meet…: A Women's Love Anthology The White Cat's Revenge as Plotted from the Dragon King's Lap The Whole of Humanity Has Gone Yuri Except for Me The Witch and the Knight Will Survive The Witch's House: The Diary of Ellen A Witch's Love at the End of the World Witch's Printing Office The Witches' Marriage With the Light Wolf and Parchment: New Theory Spice & Wolf Wolf Children: Ame & Yuki The Wolf Never Sleeps Woof Woof Story: I Told You to Turn Me Into a Pampered Pooch, Not Fenrir! Words Bubble Up Like Soda Pop The World's Finest Assassin Gets Reincarnated in Another World as an Aristocrat The World's Strongest Rearguard: Labyrinth Country's Novice Seeker Yokohama Station SF Yoshi no Zuikara: The Frog in the Well Does Not Know the Ocean Yotsuba&!+
 Your Forma Your Name. Your Name. Another Side:Earthbound Your Turn to Die: Majority Vote Death Game Yowamushi Pedal Yuri Life Zo Zo Zombie*
 Zombie-Loan† - Digital distribution rights only due to being a Square Enix title. Viz Media has the rights for series' paperback releases.

Manhwa

 7Fates: Chakho 11th Cat 13th Boy The Abandoned Empress Angel Diary The Antique Gift Shop Aron's Absurd Armada+
 Bloody Sweet The Boxer Bring It On! A Business Proposal Chocolat Comic Croquis Pop Cynical Orange Dark Moon Daughter of the Emperor Forest of Gray City Freak Goong Heavenly Executioner Chiwoo Hissing The Horizon Imitation Jack Frost+
 King of Eden Laon Legend Moon Boy My Gently Raised Beast One Fine Day+
 One Thousand and One Nights Pig Bride+
 Raiders Real Lies The Remarried Princess A Returner's Magic Should be Special Sarasah+
 Solo Leveling The Star Seekers Sugarholic Time and Again+
 Tomb Raider King Very! Very! Sweet Villains are Destined to Die Void's Enigmatic Mansion What's Wrong with Secretary Kim? Why Raeliana Ended Up at the Duke's Mansion The World After the Fall You're So CoolManhua
 An Ideal World Step The History of The West Wing Wild AnimalsLight novels

European titles
 Dystopia (Germany)
 Goldilocks and the Seven Squat Bears (France)
 Never Open It: The Taboo Trilogy (Spain)
 Toxic Planet (France)
 W.I.T.C.H. (Italy)*
 Y Square (Germany)
 Y Square Plus (Germany)

* - Published under the JY imprint

+ - Serialized in Yen Plus''

References

External links

Official website
PW article detailing absorption of ICEKunion
YS interview with Hassler on expansion into yaoi

American companies established in 2006
Book publishing companies based in New York (state)
Comic book imprints
Disney comics publishers
Kadokawa Corporation subsidiaries
Lagardère Media
Manga distributors
Manhua distributors
Manhwa distributors
Multinational joint-venture companies
Publishing companies based in New York City
Publishing companies established in 2006
2006 establishments in New York City